St. Andrews School is one of the largest schools in the state of Telangana, India. The school was established in 1985 by the Emanuel family in memory of Louis William Emanuel. St. Andrews is managed by the St. Louis Education Society. Today, it has over 20,000 students.

Branches
From a single school, the school has grown in popularity and size, expanding into three major campuses in Bowenpally, Marredpally and Keesara. The fourth branch of St. Andrews School is located in Whitefield, Bangalore.

St. Andrews Prep
Branching out to a kindergarten curriculum, St. Andrews Prep was established to satisfy the increasing demands for an Andrewite education. St. Andrews Prep offers a benchmarked kindergarten curriculum. There are four branches of St. Andrews Prep, in Sainikpuri, Dammaiguda, Yapral and Moula Ali.

See also
Education in India
List of schools in India
List of institutions of higher education in Telangana

References

External links
 http://www.standrewsindia.com

Schools in Secunderabad
High schools and secondary schools in Hyderabad, India
1985 establishments in Andhra Pradesh
Educational institutions established in 1985